Eubanks is an unincorporated community in northern Loudoun County, Virginia, United States. Eubanks is located on Woodgrove Road (VA 719) north of Round Hill and south of the South Fork Catoctin Creek.

Unincorporated communities in Loudoun County, Virginia